Willowmoore Park is a multi-purpose stadium in Benoni, South Africa. It is currently used mostly for cricket matches and hosted two matches during the 2003 Cricket World Cup. The stadium holds 20,000 people. It opened in 1924. After withdrawing their sponsorship from St George's Park in Port Elizabeth, Sahara started sponsoring Willowmoore Park, thus for sponsorship reasons it is known as "Sahara Willowmoore Park".

References

External links
 Cricinfo Website - Ground Page
 Cricket Archive page

Cricket grounds in South Africa
2003 Cricket World Cup stadiums
Sports venues in Johannesburg
Multi-purpose stadiums in South Africa